Festival Theatre may refer to:

Baltic House Festival Theatre, Russia
Chichester Festival Theatre, UK
Pitlochry Festival Theatre, UK
Edinburgh Festival Theatre, UK
Festival Theatre, Malvern, UK
Festival Theatre, Paignton, UK
Festival Theaterformen, Germany
 Festival Theatre, part of the Adelaide Festival Centre, South Australia